Marion King Lowry (March 31, 1854 – June 26, 1939) was a Virginia politician. He served as a Republican in the Virginia House of Delegates.

References

External links
 
 

1854 births
1939 deaths
Republican Party members of the Virginia House of Delegates
People from Stafford, Virginia